Karl Jäger (17 October 1833 – 15 December 1887) was a German painter.

Born in Nuremberg, Jäger studied at the Munich Academy and at the Academy of Applied Arts in Nuremberg, where he later taught drawing. Between 1882 and 1886 he painted his best-known work, Maximilian I. bei Albrecht Dürer (Maximilian I with Albrecht Dürer) for the Nuremberg town hall. He also helped to illustrate the works of Friedrich Schiller and created grisaille portraits of prominent personalities, including composers Beethoven and Haydn.

References

1833 births
1887 deaths
Artists from Nuremberg
19th-century German painters
19th-century German male artists
German male painters